Klára Seroiszková (born 25 January 2001) is a Czech ice hockey player and member of the Czech national ice hockey team, currently playing in the Swedish Women's Hockey League (SDHL) with HV71 Dam.

Seroiszková made her senior national team debut at the 2021 IIHF Women's World Championship. As a junior player with the Czech national under-18 team, she participated in the IIHF Women's U18 World Championships in 2018 and 2019.

Her senior club career began in the Czech Women's Extraliga at age 13 with SK Karviná. Seroiszková has also played in the Czech national junior leagues with the under-16 and under-20 teams of SK Karviná.

References

External links
 
 Klára Seroiszková at Hokej.cz 

Living people
2001 births
Ball hockey players
Czech expatriate ice hockey players in Sweden
Czech women's ice hockey defencemen
Göteborg HC players
HV71 Dam players
Sportspeople from Karviná